"We Right Here" is a song by American hip hop recording artist DMX, released as the first single from his fourth album The Great Depression (2001).

History

Production
The song shows the use of Pro Tools ability to create voice masking and voice doubling, with the fact that DMX does his vocals on the microphone, and then does them over the top of his previous audio track, to create a hazed, mellow sound, much like that of someone rapping with a 40 a Day voice.

Music video
The music video was shot in Baltimore, Maryland (unlike previous videos shot in New York City), and contains cameo appearances from The LOX.

In popular culture
The song is featured in the 2002 video game Test Drive: Overdrive.
The song is featured in the beginning of Martin Lawrence Live: Runteldat.
The song is featured in 2002 movie Ali G Indahouse.

Chart performance

References

2000 songs
2001 singles
DMX (rapper) songs
Ruff Ryders Entertainment singles
Def Jam Recordings singles
Songs written by DMX (rapper)